Papatoetoe Intermediate School is an intermediate school (years 7–8) in Papatoetoe, a suburb of Manukau Ward, Auckland Region, New Zealand.

The school opened in 1953 on a site adjacent to Dominion Breweries on Great South Road in Papatoetoe. The school was called Otara Intermediate School, the name used then for that part of the district. The 650 pupils enrolled at that time came from both Papatoetoe and the surrounding district. The school comprised a double storey block of 16 classrooms and several specialist rooms, including a library. The headmaster was Mr R.A. Robbie. A school committee and a home and school association were formed.

The school was renamed Papatoetoe Intermediate in 1968 to avoid confusion with the suburb of Otara taking shape a kilometre or so to the east (Kedgley Intermediate was formerly named Papatoetoe Intermediate until principal Maurice Kedgley died in office). The planning name of the school was "Middlemore Intermediate" but this name was never adopted.

References

Educational institutions established in 1953
Intermediate schools in Auckland
1953 establishments in New Zealand
Ōtara-Papatoetoe Local Board Area